The 2002–03 Greek Football Cup was the 61st edition of the Greek Football Cup. That season's edition was entitled "Vodafone Greek Cup" for sponsorship reasons.

Tournament details
The two finalists were the arch-rivals, PAOK and Aris, meeting up again in a Cup final after 33 years. PAOK had to overcome some big obstacles to reach the final. They qualified against OFI on away goals rule and eliminated league champions Olympiacos with two wins in the quarter-finals and Cup holders AEK Athens with 2–1 on aggregate in the semi-finals.

On the contrary, Aris had an easier path on their route to the final. They eliminated PAS Giannina with two wins, Ethnikos Asteras with 3–2 on aggregate in the quarter-finals and qualified against Egaleo on away goals rule in the semi-finals.

The final was held at Toumba Stadium, on 17 May 2003. PAOK defeated Aris by 1–0 with a goal scored by Georgiadis who made an impressive individual effort, dribbling past a defender with his right foot, faking a shot with his left (outsmarting another defender and the goalkeeper in the process) and finishing with a swift side-foot kick (using his left again) that launched the ball up and into the back of the net. The assist was provided by Markos. Aris had a great chance to equalize late at the game, but the ball hit the post on Morris' effort.

During the postgame press conference, Aris manager Giorgos Foiros made a complaint that the final should have been a two-legged tie because PAOK had the advantage of playing on home ground. Kaftanzoglio Stadium, a neutral ground and Thessaloniki 's largest stadium was under renovation for the 2004 Summer Olympic games. The Hellenic Football Federation's regulation for that season's Cup stated that if the final was to be held at Thessaloniki (that would be the case if at least one of the two finalists was a Thessaloniki 's team), it would be hosted at the second largest stadium of the city which was Toumba. About a week before the game, Aris demanded from the federation either the final to be played at Kalamaria or Makedonikos stadiums, both neutral grounds (with much smaller capacity though) or to be held a draw between Toumba Stadium and Kleanthis Vikelidis Stadium (Aris home ground), but both requests were denied due to the tournament's regulation.

PAOK manager Angelos Anastasiadis became the first in club's history to win the Cup both as a player, in 1974 and manager.

Calendar

Knockout phase
Each tie in the knockout phase, apart from the final, was played over two legs, with each team playing one leg at home. The team that scored more goals on aggregate over the two legs advanced to the next round. If the aggregate score was level, the away goals rule was applied, i.e. the team that scored more goals away from home over the two legs advanced. If away goals were also equal, then extra time was played. The away goals rule was again applied after extra time, i.e. if there were goals scored during extra time and the aggregate score was still level, the visiting team advanced by virtue of more away goals scored. If no goals were scored during extra time, the winners were decided by a penalty shoot-out. In the final, which were played as a single match, if the score was level at the end of normal time, extra time was played, followed by a penalty shoot-out if the score was still level.The mechanism of the draws for each round is as follows:
There are no seedings, and teams from the same group can be drawn against each other.

First round
The draw took place on 11 July 2002.

|}

Bracket
{{32TeamBracket|legs=2/2/2/2/1|byes=6|aggregate=y|seeds=n|nowrap=y|hideomittedscores=1
| RD1=Second round
| RD2=Round of 16
| RD3=Quarter-finals
| RD4=Semi-finals
| RD5=Final

| RD1-team01 = Iraklis
| RD1-team02 = Panionios
| RD1-score01-1 = 0
| RD1-score02-1 = 0
| RD1-score01-2 = 1
| RD1-score02-2 = 2
| RD1-score01-agg = 1
| RD1-score02-agg = 2

| RD1-team03 = Ionikos (bye)
| RD1-team04 = 
| RD1-score03 =
| RD1-score04 =

| RD1-team05 = AEK Athens
| RD1-team06 = Chalkidona
| RD1-score05-1 = 3
| RD1-score06-1 = 1
| RD1-score05-2 = 3
| RD1-score06-2 = 0
| RD1-score05-agg = 6
| RD1-score06-agg = 1

| RD1-team07 = Apollon Athens (bye)
| RD1-team08 = 
| RD1-score07 =
| RD1-score08 =

| RD1-team09 = PAOK
| RD1-team10 = Olympiacos Volos
| RD1-score09-1 = 2
| RD1-score10-1 = 0
| RD1-score09-2 = 0
| RD1-score10-2 = 0
| RD1-score09-agg = 2
| RD1-score10-agg = 0

| RD1-team11 = Kerkyra
| RD1-team12 = OFI
| RD1-score11-1 = 0
| RD1-score12-1 = 1
| RD1-score11-2 = 0
| RD1-score12-2 = 3
| RD1-score11-agg = 0
| RD1-score12-agg = 4

| RD1-team13 = 
| RD1-team14 = Panachaiki (bye)
| RD1-score13 =
| RD1-score14 =

| RD1-team15 = Kallithea
| RD1-team16 = Olympiacos
| RD1-score15-1 = 1
| RD1-score16-1 = 4
| RD1-score15-2 = 1
| RD1-score16-2 = 0
| RD1-score15-agg = 2
| RD1-score16-agg = 4

| RD1-team17 = Kalamata
| RD1-team18 = Akratitos
| RD1-score17-1 = 1
| RD1-score18-1 = 1
| RD1-score17-2 = 0
| RD1-score18-2 = 2
| RD1-score17-agg = 1
| RD1-score18-agg = 3

| RD1-team19 = Panathinaikos
| RD1-team20 = Skoda Xanthi
| RD1-score19-1 = 1
| RD1-score20-1 = 0
| RD1-score19-2 = 0
| RD1-score20-2 = 0
| RD1-score19-agg = 1
| RD1-score20-agg = 0

| RD1-team21 = Egaleo
| RD1-team22 = Agios Dimitrios
| RD1-score21-1 = 2
| RD1-score22-1 = 0
| RD1-score21-2 = 2
| RD1-score22-2 = 2
| RD1-score21-agg = 4
| RD1-score22-agg = 2

| RD1-team23 = Paniliakos (bye)
| RD1-team24 = 
| RD1-score23 =
| RD1-score24 =

| RD1-team25 = Patraikos
| RD1-team26 = Aris
| RD1-score25-1 = 0
| RD1-score26-1 = 1
| RD1-score25-2 = 1
| RD1-score26-2 = 3
| RD1-score25-agg = 1
| RD1-score26-agg = 4

| RD1-team27 = PAS Giannina (bye)
| RD1-team28 = 
| RD1-score27 =
| RD1-score28 =

| RD1-team29 = 
| RD1-team30 = Apollon Kalamarias (bye)
| RD1-score29 =
| RD1-score30 =

| RD1-team31 = Ergotelis
| RD1-team32 = Ethnikos Asteras 
| RD1-score31-1 = 2
| RD1-score32-1 = 0
| RD1-score31-2 = 0
| RD1-score32-2 = 3
| RD1-score31-agg = 2
| RD1-score32-agg = 3

| RD2-team01 = Panionios
| RD2-team02 = Ionikos| RD2-score01-1 = 1
| RD2-score02-1 = 0
| RD2-score01-2 = 1
| RD2-score02-2 = 1
| RD2-score01-agg = 2
| RD2-score02-agg = 1

| RD2-team03 = AEK Athens| RD2-team04 = Apollon Athens
| RD2-score03-1 = 2
| RD2-score04-1 = 0
| RD2-score03-2 = 3
| RD2-score04-2 = 0
| RD2-score03-agg = 5
| RD2-score04-agg = 0

| RD2-team05 = PAOK (a)
| RD2-team06 = OFI
| RD2-score05-1 = 0
| RD2-score06-1 = 0
| RD2-score05-2 = 1
| RD2-score06-2 = 1
| RD2-score05-agg = 1
| RD2-score06-agg = 1

| RD2-team07 = Panachaiki
| RD2-team08 = Olympiacos| RD2-score07-1 = 0
| RD2-score08-1 = 2
| RD2-score07-2 = 0
| RD2-score08-2 = 0
| RD2-score07-agg = 0
| RD2-score08-agg = 2

| RD2-team09 = Akratitos
| RD2-team10 = Panathinaikos| RD2-score09-1 = 0
| RD2-score10-1 = 1
| RD2-score09-2 = 0
| RD2-score10-2 = 3
| RD2-score09-agg = 0
| RD2-score10-agg = 4

| RD2-team11 = Egaleo| RD2-team12 = Paniliakos
| RD2-score11-1 = 4
| RD2-score12-1 = 0
| RD2-score11-2 = 2
| RD2-score12-2 = 1
| RD2-score11-agg = 6
| RD2-score12-agg = 1

| RD2-team13 = Aris| RD2-team14 = PAS Giannina
| RD2-score13-1 = 3
| RD2-score14-1 = 0
| RD2-score13-2 = 1
| RD2-score14-2 = 0
| RD2-score13-agg = 4
| RD2-score14-agg = 0

| RD2-team15 = Apollon Kalamarias
| RD2-team16 = Ethnikos Asteras| RD2-score15-1 = 0
| RD2-score16-1 = 2
| RD2-score15-2 = 1
| RD2-score16-2 = 2
| RD2-score15-agg = 1
| RD2-score16-agg = 4

| RD3-team01 = Panionios
| RD3-team02 = AEK Athens| RD3-score01-1 = 1
| RD3-score02-1 = 1
| RD3-score01-2 = 2
| RD3-score02-2 = 4
| RD3-score01-agg = 3
| RD3-score02-agg = 5

| RD3-team03 = PAOK| RD3-team04 = Olympiacos
| RD3-score03-1 = 3
| RD3-score04-1 = 1
| RD3-score03-2 = 2
| RD3-score04-2 = 1
| RD3-score03-agg = 5
| RD3-score04-agg = 2

| RD3-team05 = Panathinaikos
| RD3-team06 = Egaleo| RD3-score05-1 = 0
| RD3-score06-1 = 1
| RD3-score05-2 = 1
| RD3-score06-2 = 1
| RD3-score05-agg = 1
| RD3-score06-agg = 2

| RD3-team07 = Aris| RD3-team08 = Ethnikos Asteras
| RD3-score07-1 = 3
| RD3-score08-1 = 1
| RD3-score07-2 = 0
| RD3-score08-2 = 1
| RD3-score07-agg = 3
| RD3-score08-agg = 2

| RD4-team01 = AEK Athens
| RD4-team02 = PAOK| RD4-score01-1 = 0
| RD4-score02-1 = 1
| RD4-score01-2 = 1
| RD4-score02-2 = 1
| RD4-score01-agg = 1
| RD4-score02-agg = 2

| RD4-team03 = Egaleo
| RD4-team04 = Aris (a)
| RD4-score03-1 = 1
| RD4-score04-1 = 1
| RD4-score03-2 = 0
| RD4-score04-2 = 0
| RD4-score03-agg = 1
| RD4-score04-agg = 1

| RD5-team01 = PAOK'| RD5-team02 = Aris
| RD5-score01-1 = 1
| RD5-score02-1 = 0

}}

Second round
The draw took place on 27 September 2002.

||colspan="2" rowspan="6" 

|}

Round of 16
The draw took place on 28 November 2002.

Summary

|}

MatchesAEK Athens won 5–0 on aggregate.PAOK won on away goals.Aris won 4–0 on aggregate.Panionios won 2–1 on aggregate.Olympiacos won 2–0 on aggregate.Egaleo won 6–1 on aggregate.Ethnikos Asteras won 4–1 on aggregate.Panathinaikos won 4–0 on aggregate.Quarter-finals
The draw took place on 30 January 2003.

Summary

|}

MatchesEgaleo won 2–1 on aggregate.AEK Athens won 5–3 on aggregate.Aris won 3–2 on aggregate.PAOK won 5–2 on aggregate.Semi-finals
The draw took place on 20 March 2003.

Summary

|}

MatchesAris won on away goals.PAOK won 2–1 on aggregate.''

Final

References

External links
Greek Cup 2002-2003 at RSSSF
Greek Cup 2002-2003 at Hellenic Football Federation's official site

Greek Football Cup seasons
Greek Cup
Cup